Daviess County ( "Davis"), is a county in Kentucky. As of the 2020 census, the population was 103,312. Its county seat is Owensboro. The county was formed from part of Ohio County on January 14, 1815.

Daviess County is included in the Owensboro, KY Metropolitan Statistical Area. Daviess County also shares its namesake with another nearby Daviess County of Indiana. Both Counties are in the Illinois-Indiana-Kentucky Tri-State Area.

History
Daviess County was established in 1815. The county is named for Major Joseph Hamilton Daveiss (a recording error in the State Clerk's office accounts for the error in spelling, which was never corrected), the United States Attorney who unsuccessfully prosecuted Aaron Burr. The county's borders were altered in 1829 to form Hancock County, in 1830 to absorb a small area surrounding Whitesville, in 1854 to cede land to McLean County, and finally in 1860 to annex  from Henderson County.

The courthouse was burned in January 1865 during the American Civil War, but the county records were spared destruction because they had been transferred to a church.

Geography
The northern half of the county along the Ohio River is relatively flat, with a few rolling hills dotting the landscape. The southern portion is mostly rolling hills mixed with flat valleys. The southern portion was mined for coal in the past, especially in the rolling hills along Panther Creek and other streams.

Adjacent counties
 Warrick County, Indiana  (northwest)
 Spencer County, Indiana  (northeast)
 Hancock County  (east)
 Ohio County  (southeast)
 McLean County  (southwest)
 Henderson County  (west)

Demographics

As of the census of 2010, there were 96,656 people, 36,033 households, and 24,826 families residing in the county. The racial makeup of the county was 93.69% White, 4.35% Black or African American, 0.13% Native American, 0.43% Asian, 0.02% Pacific Islander, 0.44% from other races, and 0.94% from two or more races. 0.92% of the population were Hispanic or Latino of any race.

There were 36,033 households, out of which 32.90% had children under the age of 18 living with them, 53.60% were married couples living together, 11.80% had a female householder with no husband present, and 31.10% were non-families. 27.10% of all households were made up of individuals, and 11.10% had someone living alone who was 65 years of age or older. The average household size was 2.47 and the average family size was 3.00.

In the county, the population was spread out, with 25.80% under the age of 18, 9.00% from 18 to 24, 28.40% from 25 to 44, 23.00% from 45 to 64, and 13.80% who were 65 years of age or older. The median age was 37 years. For every 100 females, there were 92.60 males. For every 100 females age 18 and over, there were 88.30 males.

The median income for a household in the county was $36,813, and the median income for a family was $45,404. Males had a median income of $35,295 versus $21,971 for females. The per capita income for the county was $18,739. About 9.40% of families and 12.30% of the population were below the poverty line, including 15.60% of those under age 18 and 11.40% of those age 65 or over.

Economy

Distilling
Daviess County has long had a reputation as the leading center of the production of distilled spirits, chiefly Kentucky bourbon. Walter McFarland, who moved here from North Carolina, began making whiskey and peach brandy in about 1804 on a  estate just south of Panther Creek, on today's U.S. 431. It finally closed in 1872, after more than 60 years of production.

By the 1880s, 18 large distilleries operated in Daviess County at the same time. Today only three remain. One dates back to 1869, the former Glenmore Distillery Company, which was originally the R. Monarch Distillery. Charles Medley Distillers Kentucky is at least the 59th distillery in the county's history.

Trinidad-based Angostura Limited bought the Medley Distillery in 2007 with plans to make its entrance into the world's bourbon market, but the severe global recession slowed plans for starting bourbon production in Daviess County for the first time since 1992.

The following is list of distilleries operating in 1883
 Owensboro Distilling Company, founded 1880
 Sour-Mash Distilling Company, founded 1868
 Hill, Perkins and Company, founded 1880
 Rock Spring Distillery, founded 1881
 Hill and Perkins Distillery, founded 1866
 R. Monarch Distillery, founded 1869, acquired and renamed in 1901 Glenmore Distillery Company
 E.P. Millet and Company, founded 1880
 John Thixton Distillery Company
 John Hanning Distillery Company, founded 1869
 Eagle Distillery Company, founded 1869
 Daviess county Distilling Company, founded April 16, 1874
 M.P. Mattingly's Distyillery, founded 1855
 Daviess County Club Distillery, founded 1880
 J.W.M. Field Distillery, founded February 3, 1873
 J.T. Welch Distilling Company, founded March 1, 1881
 Boulware and Wilhoute's Distillery, founded 1880
 C.L. Appelgate and Company distillery, founded 1879 at Yelvington, Kentucky

Coal mining
The southwestern portion of the county around the Panther Creek area was heavily mined through the 1960s till the early 1990s. After 1998 large tracts of mined land were left unclaimed. Then after a lengthy search for contractors by the state government's Division of Abandoned Mine Lands, work commenced on the largest tract, a  tract once part of the now defunct Green Coal Company. The  of unclaimed land were part of Green Coal Company's mine once known as the "Panther Surface Mine". Green Coal Company was a staple mining company in Daviess County and was based nearby in Henderson.

Reclamation work commenced at the site on November 8, 1999, and was completed April 14, 2000. The licensed blaster employed by the contractor blasted the highwall into the pit, resulting in a reduced effort to grade and dress the final slope. Enough topsoil was gained from the area above the highwall to allow a growing medium for re-vegetation purposes. Through innovative field techniques and extraordinary cooperation from the contractor, this site has been returned to a very safe, stable and productive property. All  of this project was reclaimed expending $127,538.82 of the available bond. The land is now safe for the public and is considered prime farm property once again.

Politics

Communities

Cities
 Owensboro (county seat)
 Whitesville

Census-designated places

 Curdsville
 Knottsville
 Maceo
 Masonville
 Moseleyville
 Panther
 Pleasant Ridge (partially in Ohio County)
 Utica

Other unincorporated communities

West Daviess

 Birk City
 Browns Valley
 Delaware
 Friendly Village
 Livia (partially in McLean County)
 Pettit
 Rome
 Sorgho
 Stanley
 Sutherland
 Tuck
 West Louisville

East Daviess

 Dermont
 Ensor
 Gatewood
 Habit
 Philpot
 Saint Joseph
 Scythia
 Spice Knob
 Thruston
 Yelvington

See also

 List of Sheriffs of Daviess County, Kentucky
 National Register of Historic Places listings in Daviess County, Kentucky

References

External links
 Daviess County government's website

 
Kentucky counties
Kentucky counties on the Ohio River
1815 establishments in Kentucky
Populated places established in 1815
Owensboro metropolitan area